Wálter Enrique Quesada Cordero (born 9 May 1970) is a Costa Rican retired football referee.

He has been a FIFA International referee since 2001.

During his career he was appointed for four CONCACAF Gold Cup tournaments where he took charge of a single group stage fixtures in 2005 (Mexico vs Jamaica), 2007 (Honduras vs Mexico) and 2009 (United States vs Haiti). In the 2011 edition he officiated another group stage match (Jamaica vs Guatemala) before being handed a quarterfinal between Panama and El Salvador.

Later in 2011 he was selected for his maiden Copa América.

References 
 WorldReferee.com - Wálter Quesada

1970 births
Living people
Costa Rican football referees
Copa América referees
CONCACAF Gold Cup referees
CONCACAF Champions League referees